Jeffrey Uhlman Beaverstock (born November 29, 1968) is the Chief United States district judge of the United States District Court for the Southern District of Alabama.

Biography 

Beaverstock was born in 1968 in Waterbury, Connecticut.

Beaverstock earned his Bachelor of Arts from The Citadel, where he was selected as the Distinguished Military Graduate and as the Most Outstanding Army Cadet. He earned his Juris Doctor from the University of Alabama School of Law, where he served as managing editor of the Alabama Law Review.

Before entering legal practice, he served on active duty for four years as an Airborne Ranger Infantry Officer in the United States Army, and has served in the United States Army Reserve since leaving active duty. He currently holds the rank of Lieutenant Colonel in the Judge Advocate General's Corps of the U.S. Army (Reserve) and is the Chief of Contract and Administrative Law for the 377th Theater Sustainment Command. Before becoming a judge, Beaverstock was a partner in the Mobile, Alabama, office of Burr & Forman, LLP, where his practice focused on civil and commercial litigation in state and federal courts.

Federal judicial service 

On September 7, 2017, President Donald Trump nominated Beaverstock to serve as a United States District Judge of the United States District Court for the Southern District of Alabama, to the seat vacated by Judge Callie V. Granade, who assumed senior status on March 7, 2016. On October 17, 2017, a hearing on his nomination was held before the Senate Judiciary Committee. On November 9, 2017, his nomination was reported out of committee by voice vote.

On January 3, 2018, his nomination was returned to the President under Rule XXXI, Paragraph 6 of the United States Senate. On January 5, 2018, President Donald Trump announced his intent to renominate Beaverstock to a federal judgeship. On January 8, 2018, his renomination was sent to the Senate. On January 18, 2018, his nomination was reported out of committee by a 16–5 vote. On August 1, 2018, his nomination was confirmed by voice vote. He received his judicial commission on August 3, 2018. He became Chief Judge on October 1, 2021.

References

External links 
 

1968 births
Living people
20th-century American lawyers
21st-century American lawyers
21st-century American judges
Alabama lawyers
Alabama Republicans
Judges of the United States District Court for the Southern District of Alabama
People from Waterbury, Connecticut
The Citadel, The Military College of South Carolina alumni
United States Army officers
United States Army reservists
United States district court judges appointed by Donald Trump
University of Alabama School of Law alumni